Miyagam Karjan Junction railway station is a railway station in Vadodara district, Gujarat. Its code is MYG . It serves Karjan town. The station consists of 5 platforms. The platform is not well sheltered. It lacks many facilities including water and sanitation. Many Passenger, MEMU, Express and Superfast trains halt here.

Major trains

Following Express/Superfast trains halt at Miyagam Karjan Junction railway station in both direction:

 19033/34 Gujarat Queen
 12929/30 Valsad–Vadodara Intercity Superfast Express
 19015/16 Saurashtra Express
 22929/30 Dahanu Road–Vadodara Superfast Express
 22953/54 Gujarat Superfast Express
 19019/20 Bandra Terminus–Haridwar Express
 20907/08 Dadar–Bhuj Sayajinagari Express

References 

Railway stations in Vadodara district
Vadodara railway division
Railway junction stations in Gujarat